Ringvål is a village in the municipality of Trondheim in Trøndelag county, Norway. The village is located in the borough of Heimdal, at the mouth of the Gaula River between the urban areas of Heimdal and Spongdal.

References

Geography of Trondheim
Villages in Trøndelag